Hüseynuşağı (also, Guseynushagy and Guseyn-Ushagi) is a village in the Qubadli Rayon of Azerbaijan.

Hüseyinuşağı is the Kurdish village in Qubadli.

References 

Populated places in Qubadli District